Below is a list of selected paintings by Swiss artist Arnold Böcklin.

References
 Translated from the equivalent article on Russian Wikipedia

Böcklin, Arnold

Lists of paintings